Gatithi is a settlement in Kenya's Central Province.

As the crow flies, it is located 12.9 kilometres from Kerugoya and 88 kilometres from Nairobi.

References 

Populated places in Central Province (Kenya)